Sun Bianbian (born 27 July 1988) is a Chinese Para-cyclist. She represented China in the 2020 Summer Paralympics.

Career
Sun represented China in the 2020 Summer Paralympics where she won the silver medal in the road time trial H4–5 and road race H5 events.

References

1988 births
Living people
Chinese female cyclists
Cyclists at the 2020 Summer Paralympics
Medalists at the 2020 Summer Paralympics
Paralympic medalists in cycling
Paralympic silver medalists for China
21st-century Chinese women